The Ephraim Ward House is a historic house at 121 Ward Street in Newton, Massachusetts.  The two-story wood-frame house was built in 1821, and is one of a few Federal style houses in eastern Newton.  This house was built by Ephraim Ward to replace one built by his ancestor, John Ward, in 1661 on the same site.  The Wards owned farmland in the area until the early 20th century.  The house is five bays wide, with a hip roof and clapboard siding, and a central entrance flanked by pilasters and topped by a paneled entablature.

The house was listed on the National Register of Historic Places in 1986.

See also
 National Register of Historic Places listings in Newton, Massachusetts

References

Houses on the National Register of Historic Places in Newton, Massachusetts
Federal architecture in Massachusetts
Houses completed in 1821
1821 establishments in Massachusetts